Steve Evetts is an American record producer who has produced music for Alesana, Poison the Well, A Static Lullaby, The Dillinger Escape Plan, Sepultura, Symphony X, Saves the Day, Lifetime, Kid Dynamite, Hightower, Story of the Year, Every Time I Die, Earth Crisis, Still Remains, Our Last Night, and The Wonder Years. Steve Evetts has been an active producer since 1992, producing mostly metal albums, as well as indie, and emo bands.

Discography

References

Living people
Year of birth missing (living people)
Place of birth missing (living people)
American record producers